PFO may refer to:
 Patent foramen ovale - a blood-flow pathway between a human heart's atriums, normally naturally closed after birth
 Personal Freedom Outreach - an Evangelical organization opposing cults
 Pittsburgh Film Office
 IATA code for Paphos International Airport
 Pathfinder Roleplaying Game  - online version
 Persistent Felony Offender - a defendant accused under a three-strikes law
 Hong Kong's Public Finance Ordinance.